Jeremy Roberts (born November 10, 1991) is a former MPP Ottawa West—Nepean. He was first elected in the 2018 provincial election. In the 2022 Ontario general election, he was defeated by 908 votes to NDP candidate Chandra Pasma and was the only incumbent MPP from the Progressive Conservative Party of Ontario to be defeated.

Roberts credits his decision to enter politics to his brother who has autism. Prior and during his time in office, Roberts was a strong advocate for supporting individuals with autism and raising funds for the Children's Hospital of Eastern Ontario.

Prior to being elected, Roberts served as a political assistant to former federal Finance Minister Jim Flaherty and MP Dan Albas.

Political activism & career
Roberts has been involved in politics since the 2007 Ontario general election, in which he volunteered for the Progressive Conservatives led by John Tory. He volunteered in the 2011 and 2014 Ontario general election for the party led by Tim Hudak. His last election in which he volunteered prior to becoming a candidate was the 2015 Canadian federal election for the Conservatives, led by then-Prime Minister Stephen Harper.

During the nomination process for the Progressive Conservatives during the 2018 Ontario general election in Ottawa West-Nepean, Roberts had initially lost the nomination but interim leader Vic Fedeli overturned the nomination of MacGregor. Roberts re-entered the race and was acclaimed the nominee in March.

Roberts won the election in Ottawa West-Nepean by 176 votes over the NDP candidate Chandra Pasma. As there was no recount challenge made by Pasma, Roberts was formally declared to be elected in the riding.

On June 26, 2019, Roberts was appointed by Premier Doug Ford to serve as the Parliamentary Assistant to Minister of Children, Community and Social Services Todd Smith for Community and Social Services.

On October 6, 2020, Roberts introduced Bill 214 to the Ontario Legislature. If enacted, the bill would enact that, synchronously with New York and Quebec should they pass similar laws, Ontario stay on Daylight Time (DT) year-round. On November 25, 2020, the bill was passed with unanimous support in the Legislature.

Personal life
Roberts lives in Ottawa. His mother is a nurse and his father is the manager of the Almonte General Hospital Foundation. He has a younger brother with autism. After completing high school at Canterbury High School, he attended Carleton University for political science and the University of Oxford, where he attained his Master of Public Policy from the Blavatnik School of Government.

Roberts is openly gay, coming out in a column post for the Ottawa Citizen on March 15, 2022.

Electoral record

Government positions

References

Progressive Conservative Party of Ontario MPPs
21st-century Canadian politicians
Politicians from Ottawa
Living people
1991 births
Canadian LGBT people in provincial and territorial legislatures
Gay politicians
21st-century Canadian LGBT people
Canadian gay men